Betzabeth Argüello (born January 28, 1991) is a Venezuelan freestyle wrestler. She competed in the women's freestyle 53 kg event at the 2016 Summer Olympics, in which she lost the bronze medal match to Nataliya Synyshyn.

She won the gold medal in her event at the 2017 Bolivarian Games held in Santa Marta, Colombia.

She won one of the bronze medals in her event at the 2022 Pan American Wrestling Championships held in Acapulco, Mexico. She won the silver medal in her event at the 2022 Bolivarian Games held in Valledupar, Colombia. She won one of the bronze medals in her event at the 2022 South American Games held in Asunción, Paraguay.

References

External links
 

1991 births
Living people
Venezuelan female sport wrestlers
Olympic wrestlers of Venezuela
Wrestlers at the 2016 Summer Olympics
People from Cojedes (state)
Pan American Games medalists in wrestling
Pan American Games silver medalists for Venezuela
Pan American Games bronze medalists for Venezuela
Medalists at the 2015 Pan American Games
Medalists at the 2019 Pan American Games
Wrestlers at the 2015 Pan American Games
Wrestlers at the 2019 Pan American Games
Pan American Wrestling Championships medalists
South American Games bronze medalists for Venezuela
South American Games medalists in wrestling
Competitors at the 2022 South American Games
21st-century Venezuelan women